The Northeast Grand Prix (until 2006: New England Grand Prix) is a professional sports car race held at Lime Rock Park in Lakeville, Connecticut, United States as part of the IMSA WeatherTech SportsCar Championship. Previous editions of the Grand Prix belonged to the SCCA National Sports Car Championship, the IMSA GT Championship and the American Le Mans Series. The race currently has a duration of 2 hours and 40 minutes and takes place in July, previously having been held on Independence Day weekend compared to the Lime Rock Grand Prix that was held on Memorial Day weekend.

Winners

References

External links
United SportsCar Championship official site
World Sports Racing Prototypes: SCCA Nationals archive
World Sports Racing Prototypes: IMSA archive
World Sports Racing Prototypes: ALMS archive
Racing Sports Cars: Lime Rock archive
Ultimate Racing History: Lime Rock archive